Karl Alfred Poppius (1846 Jaakkima, Karelia – 1920 Helsinki)  was a Finnish entomologist who worked on Lepidoptera, Coleoptera and Hemiptera.

Works
Finland's Dendrometridae, 1887
Finland's Phytometridae, 1891

References
Groll, E. K. (2017) Biographies of the Entomologists of the World. Online database, version 8, Senckenberg Deutsches Entomologisches Institut, Müncheberg.

Finnish entomologists
Finnish lepidopterists
1920 deaths
1846 births